George G. Dillard (born 1839) was an American lawyer, soldier, and politician. He served as a sergeant in the Confederate Army, a commander in Mississippi's National Guard, and a leading delegate at the 1890 Mississippi Constitutional Convention. He represented the 19th District in the Mississippi State Senate from 1884 to 1892. He represented Noxubee County at the 1890 Mississippi Constitutional Convention.

He was born in the year 1839 in Oktibbeha County, Mississippi.

He was a National Guard commander at the unveiling ceremonies for a monument to Confederate Army veterans in Jackson, Mississippi.

References

1839 births
19th-century American politicians
Mississippi state senators
Date of birth missing
Confederate States Army soldiers
People from Noxubee County, Mississippi
Mississippi National Guard personnel

Year of death missing